Infante of Portugal (Portuguese: Infante de Portugal; f. Infanta), is the royal title of the Kingdom of Portugal, granted to the sons or daughters of the King and Princes of Portugal who were not the heir to the throne. It is also used to denote a grandson or granddaughter in the male line of a reigning monarch. Female consorts of Infantes of Portugal automatically gain the title of nobility of Infanta when married. Male consorts to Infantas of Portugal do not have an inherent right to the title of Infante upon marriage (cf., for instance, Nuno José Severo de Mendoça Rolim de Moura Barreto, 1st Duke of Loulé).

See also
Kingdom of Portugal
Prince Royal of Portugal
Prince of Brazil
Prince of Portugal
Prince of Beira
House of the Infantado

 
 
Portuguese royalty
Portuguese monarchy
Portuguese nobility
Noble titles